Fossil fuel subsidies are energy subsidies on fossil fuels. They may be tax breaks on consumption, such as a lower sales tax on natural gas for residential heating; or subsidies on production, such as  tax breaks on exploration for oil. Or they may be free or cheap negative externalities; such as air pollution or climate change due to burning gasoline, diesel and jet fuel. Some fossil fuel subsidies are via electricity generation, such as subsidies for coal-fired power stations.  

Eliminating fossil fuel subsidies would reduce the health risks of air pollution, and would greatly reduce global carbon emissions thus helping to limit climate change. , policy researchers estimate that substantially more money is spent on fossil fuel subsidies than on environmentally harmful agricultural subsidies or environmentally harmful water subsidies.

The International Energy Agency says that “High fossil fuel prices hit the poor hardest, but subsidies are rarely well-targeted to protect vulnerable groups and tend to benefit better-off segments of the population.”

Despite the G20 countries having pledged to phase-out inefficient fossil fuel subsidies,   they continue because of voter demand or for energy security. Global fossil fuel consumption subsidies in 2022 have been estimated at one trillion dollars; although they vary each year depending on oil prices they are consistently hundreds of billions of dollars.

Definition 
Fossil fuel subsidies have been described as "any government action that lowers the cost of fossil fuel energy production, raises the price received by energy producers, or lowers the price paid by energy consumers." Including negative externalities such as health costs results in a much larger total. Thus by the IMF definition they are far larger than by the OECD and International Energy Agency (IEA) definitions.

Subsidies for electricity and heat may be taken into account, depending on the share produced by fossil fuels. Sometimes there are disputes about the what definition to use: for example the UK government said in 2021 that it uses the IEA definition and does not subsidize fossil fuels, but others said the same year that under the OECD definition it does.

Measurement 
Subsidies may be estimated by adding up direct subsidies from government, comparing prices in a country to world market prices, and sometimes attempting to include the cost of damage to human health and the climate. In 2020 The Guardian reported that "governments [were] spending vastly more in support of fossil fuels than on low-carbon energy in rescue packages triggered by the coronavirus crisis...despite rhetoric from many countries in support of a 'green recovery'." In 2021 The Guardian reported on an IMF study detailing how "the fossil fuel industry gets subsidies of $11m a minute...[and]...trillions of dollars a year are ‘adding fuel to the fire’ of the climate crisis... Setting fossil fuel prices that reflect their true cost would cut global CO2 emissions by over a third, the IMF analysts said."

Effects 
Subsidies on consumption reduce the price of energy for end consumers, for example the cost of gasoline for car drivers in Iran. This may win votes at elections and some people in government say it helps poorer citizens.

The consensus among economists is that the rich get most absolute benefit from fossil fuel subsidies, for example the poorest people do not usually own cars. But removing the subsidies may hit poor people via indirect price increases such as food prices, so they get a lot of benefit relative to their total income. Producers, such as oil companies, say that increasing taxes on them would cause unemployment and reduce national energy security.

Health effects 
Subsidies are estimated to cause hundreds of thousands of deaths from air pollution each year.

Economic effects 

Fossil fuel subsidies are a negative carbon price and use government money that could be spent on other things. The International Monetary Fund says that by encouraging excess energy use they can make countries more vulnerable to variation in international energy prices. However some governments say that the subsidies are necessary to shield citizens from such variation.  According to the International Energy Agency (IEA) phasing out fossil fuel subsidies would benefit energy markets, climate change mitigation and government budgets.

Environmental effects 

Subsidies affect the environment and removing them would save the carbon budget and help limit climate change.

Phase-out 

Many economists recommend replacing consumption subsidies with direct payments targeted at poor people or households.

History 
Tax breaks for oil and gas exploration have been in place since at least the early 20th century.

Subsidies by fuel

Coal 
Coal subsidies in 2020 have been estimated at 1.7 billion dollars.

Oil 
Oil subsidies in 2020 have been estimated at 90 billion dollars.

Gas 
Gas subsidies in 2020 have been estimated at 37 billion dollars.

Subsidies by country 

The International Energy Agency estimates that governments subsidised consumption of fossil fuels by US $1 trillion in 2022. At their meeting in September 2009 the G-20 countries committed to "rationalize and phase out over the medium term inefficient fossil fuel subsidies that encourage wasteful consumption".

The 2010s saw many other countries reducing energy subsidies, for instance in July 2014 Ghana abolished all diesel and gasoline subsidies, whilst in the same month Egypt raised diesel prices 63% as part of a raft of reforms intended to remove subsidies within 5 years.

In Sept, 2021, the IMF produced a working paper with estimates for the subsidies caused by the gap between the efficient price of fossil fuels and user prices. "Underpricing for local air pollution costs is the largest contributor to global fossil fuel subsidies, accounting for 42 percent, followed by global warming costs (29 percent), other local externalities such as congestion and road accidents (15 percent), explicit subsidies (8 percent) and foregone consumption tax revenue (6 percent)." Globally, fossil fuel subsidies were $5.9 trillion which amounts to 6.8% of GDP in 2020 and are expected to rise to 7.4% in 2025.

The table below shows excerpts from a 2021 IMF study for 20 countries with biggest subsidies. It also shows the biggest component of explicit subsidies, electricity costs, and of implicit subsidies, coal. See these references for complete data: (Units are billions of 2021 US dollars.)

Canada 

The Canadian federal government offers subsidies for fossil fuel exploration and production and Export Development Canada regularly provides financing to oil and gas companies. A 2018 report from the Overseas Development Institute, a UK-based think tank, found that Canada spent a greater proportion of its GDP on fiscal support to oil and gas production in 2015 and 2016 than any other G7 country.

In 2018, in response to low Canadian oil prices, the federal government announced $1.6 billion in financial support for the oil and gas sector: $1 billion in loans to oil and gas exporters from Export Development Canada, $500 million in financing for “higher risk” oil and gas companies from the Business Development Bank of Canada, $50 million through Natural Resources Canada’s Clean Growth Program, and $100 million through Innovation, Science and Economic Development Canada’s Strategic Innovation Fund. Minister of Natural Resources Amarjeet Sohi said that this financing is “not a subsidy for fossil fuels”, adding that “These are commercial loans, made available on commercial terms. We have committed to phasing out inefficient fossil fuel subsidies by 2025, and we stand by that commitment". Canada has committed to phase out fossil fuel subsidies by 2023.

Canadian provincial governments also offer subsidies for the consumption of fossil fuels. For example, Saskatchewan offers a fuel tax exemption for farmers and a sales tax exemption for natural gas used for heating.

A 2018 report from the Overseas Development Institute was critical of Canada's reporting and transparency practices around its fossil fuel subsidies. Canada does not publish specific reports on its fiscal support for fossil fuels, and when Canada’s Office of the Auditor-General attempted an audit of Canadian fossil fuel subsidies in 2017, they found much of the data they needed was not provided by Finance Canada. Export Development Canada reports on their transactions related to fossil fuel projects, but do not provide data on exact amounts or the stage of project development.

China 

The energy policy of China says that  energy security requires subsidy of production and consumption of fossil fuels including coal, oil and natural gas.

India 

In financial year 2021 fossil fuel subsidies have been estimated at 9 times renewable energy subsidies: with INR 55,250 crore for oil and gas and INR 12,976 crore for coal.

Iran 

Contrary to the subsidy reform plan's objectives, under President Rouhani the volume of Iranian subsidies given to its citizens on fossil fuel increased 42% in 2019 to over 15% of Iran’s GDP and 16% of total global energy subsidies. This has made Iran the world's largest subsidizer of energy prices. This situation is leading to highly wasteful consumption patterns, large budget deficits, price distortions in its entire economy, pollution and very lucrative (multi-billion dollars) contraband (because of price differentials) with neighbouring countries each year by rogue elements within the Iranian government supporting the status-quo.

Libya 
Libya had the highest subsidy by percent GDP in 2020 at 17.5%.

Russia 

Russia holds the world’s largest natural gas reserves (27% of total), the second-largest coal reserves, and the eighth-largest oil reserves. Russia is the world's third-largest energy subsidizer as of 2015. The country subsidizes electricity and natural gas as well as oil extraction. Approximately 60% of the subsidies go to natural gas, with the remainder spent on electricity (including under-pricing of gas delivered to power stations). For oil extraction the government gives tax exemptions and duty reductions amounting to about 22 billion dollars a year. Some of the tax exemptions and duty reductions also apply to natural gas extraction, though the majority is allocated for oil.  The large subsidies of Russia are costly and it is recommended in order to help the economy that Russia lowers its domestic subsidies. However, the potential elimination of energy subsidies in Russia carries the risk of social unrest that makes Russian authorities reluctant to remove them.

Saudi Arabia 
Most energy subsidies in Saudi Arabia are implicit in nature. This is due to the fact domestic oil prices are generally below global market prices but above domestic production costs, leading to forgone revenue but not direct subsidy costs. Contrary to the estimates above, a recent paper posits that the incremental electricity subsidy in Saudi Arabia has been eliminated as a result of the 2018 domestic energy price reforms.

Turkey

Venezuela 
2020 subsidy has been estimated at 7% of GDP. In 2021 the subsidized and rationed gasoline price was around 25 US cents a litre, whereas the unsubsidized price was about 50 cents a litre.

References

Bibliography

External links 
 Fossil fuels OECD
 Fossil Fuel Subsidy Reform United Nations Development Programme
 Fossil fuel subsidy tracker International Institute for Sustainable Development

Subsidies
Fossil fuels